New Jersey Swimming (NJ) is the Local Swimming Committee (LSC) (governing body) for competitive swimming in the central and northern New Jersey area.  They are a member of USA Swimming and the Eastern Zone. Most of the athletes who compete in NJ-sponsored swim meets are youths under the age of 18.

Governing areas
NJ is one of the 59 LSCs of USA Swimming. NJ covers the 13 counties north of, and including, Mercer and Monmouth county. All of NJ lies within the state of New Jersey.

Clubs
There are over 60 clubs registered in the NJ LSC, with new teams being added yearly. Teams include: 
 ACE Swim Team
 APEX Predators 
 Berkeley Aquatic Club 
 Bergen Barracuda Swim Club
 Brigantine Green Heads Swim Team
 BJCC Bridgewater Tide
 Cougar Aquatic Team
 Clifton Boys and Girls Club
 Central Jersey Aquatic Club
 Deep End Aquatics Swim Club
 Eagle Aquatic Club
 Eastern Express Swim Team
 Elite Swim Club
 Fanwood Scotch Plains YMCA
 Greater Morristown YMCA
 Greater Monmouth County
 Greater Somerset County YMCA
 Highlander Aquatic Club
 Hamilton Y Aquatic Club
 Hunterdon County YMCA
 Healthquest Hammerheads
 Jersey City Bolts
 Jersey Flyers Aquatic Club
 Jersey Gator Swim Club
 Lakeland hills Family YMCA
 Madison Area YMCA Mariners
 Metro Area Life Time
 Monmouth Barracudas
 Morris County Swim Club
 Morris Center YMCA
 Metuchen-Edison YMCA
 Montclair YMCA Dolphins
 New Jersey Bluestreaks
 New Jersey Race Club
 New Jersey Wave Swim Team
 Newark Piranhas
 Ocean County YMCA Tigersharks
 Peddie Aquatic Association
 Pennington Aquatic
 Pioneer Aquatic Club INC.
 Pirate Swim Club
 Princeton Piranhas Swim Team
 Princeton Tigers Aquatic Club
 Red Bank YMCA
 Red Hawk Swim Club
 Raritan Valley YMCA
 Rough Rider Aquatic Club
 Ridgewood YMCA Breakers
 Rutgers University Swimming
 Scarlet Aquatics
Sino-US Warriors Aquatic Club
 Streamline Aquatics Club
 Summit Area YMCA Seals
 Seton Hall University Swimming
 Sussex County YMCA
 Skyy Swim Team
 Stevens Sharks
 The Atlantic Club
 The Tidal Wave Swim Team
 West Essex YMCA
 Wave Runners
 Wyckoff YMCA
 Whitewater Swimming
 Westfield YMCA
 X-Cel Swimming
 YMCA of Western Monmouth County

Governance
The New Jersey LSC is run by its board of directors, elected by the House of Delegates.

Notable people
David Curtiss (born 2002), competitive swimmer, Hamilton Y Aquatic Club, national YMCA record setter in the 50-yard freestyle.
 Jack Alexy (born 2003), competitive swimmer, swam for Greater Somerset County YMCA, Broke 17-18 National Age Group Record for 100-Meter freestyle.  Now swimmer of University of California Berkeley

References

Swimming organizations
Sports in New Jersey